Two ships of the United States Navy have been named Absecon, after Absecon Inlet, located north of Atlantic City, New Jersey:

  was a single-screw, steel-hulled freighter built in 1918, which saw less than one month of non-commissioned service in October–November 1918
  was a Barnegat-class seaplane tender in commission as a catapult training ship from 1943 to 1947

See also
 , later WHEC-374

Sources
 

United States Navy ship names